Stary Varyash (İśke Wäräş) is a rural locality (a selo) and the administrative centre of Starovaryashsky Selsoviet, Yanaulsky District, Bashkortostan, Russia. The population was 285 as of 2010. There are 6 streets.

Geography 
Stary Varyash is located 40 km southeast of Yanaul (the district's administrative centre) by road. Budya Varyash is the nearest rural locality.

References 

Rural localities in Yanaulsky District